Akari (written: , , , , , , ,  in hiragana or  in katakana) is a feminine Japanese given name. Notable people with the name include:

, Japanese musician and YouTuber
Akari Akase (あかせ あかり, born 2001), Japanese singer, cosplayer, gravure idol, internet personality, and actress
, Japanese AV idol, actress and gravure model
Akari Endo (born 1989), Dominican-Japanese actress
, Japanese freestyle wrestler
, Japanese idol, singer, actress and model
, Japanese voice actress
Akari Inaba (born 1998), Japanese water polo player
, Japanese voice actress
, Japanese video game composer
, Japanese retired middle-distance runner
, Japanese voice actress
, Japanese women's footballer
, Japanese professional footballer 
Akari Midorikawa (born 2005), Japanese professional squash player
, Japanese singer, voice actress
, Japanese judoka
, Japanese volleyball player
, Japanese idol and singer
, Japanese professional footballer 
, Japanese idol and singer
, Japanese professional footballer
, Japanese idol and singer
, Japanese video game producer
, Japanese idol and singer
, Japanese model and actress
, Japanese idol and singer

Fictional characters
, a character in the manga series YuruYuri
, a character in the anime series Hikaru No Go
, a character in the visual novel Moe! Ninja Girls
, a character in the anime series Digimon Xros Wars
, a character in the video game The Last Blade
, a character in the visual novel To Heart
, a character in the manga series March Comes in like a Lion
, a character in the manga series Kin-iro Mosaic
, a character in the manga series Aria
, a character in the anime series Chance Pop Session
, a character in the anime film 5 Centimeters Per Second
, a character in the anime series Jewelpet Twinkle
, a character in the anime series Aikatsu!
, a character in the anime series Day Break Illusion
, a character in the anime series Yu-Gi-Oh! Zexal
, a character in the manga series Ranma ½
Akari Nitta (あかり新田), a character in the manga and anime series Jujutsu Kaisen
Akari Oborodzuka (朧塚アカリ), a character played by Hatsune Miku in the "Onibi Series", a series of songs by Masa. 

Japanese feminine given names